The Javan elephant (Elephas maximus sondaicus) was proposed by Paules Edward Pieris Deraniyagala in 1953, based on an illustration of a carving on the Buddhist monument of Borobudur in Java. He thought that the Asian elephant (Elephas maximus) had indeed existed on the island and had gone extinct. It may be considered synonymous with the Sumatran elephant (E. maximus sumatranus).

Fossils of the Asian elephant have been found in Pleistocene deposits on Java. The question of when elephants became extinct on Java is unsettled. Chinese chronicles contemporary with the period of Hindu influence in Java recorded that Javan kings rode on elephants, and that Java exported ivory to China. As elephants were, at least occasionally, transported by ship, it is possible that the elephants in Java during the period of Hindu influence had been imported from India.

A tradition in the northeastern part of Borneo holds that the Borneo elephants that currently live in the wild there, and the elephants that formerly lived in the wild on the neighboring island of Sulu, are descended from elephants from Java that were presented by the "Raja of Java" (perhaps, the leader of Majapahit) to Rajah Baguinda of Sulu at the end of the 14th century. Another tradition holds that elephants were presented to the Sultan of Sulu by the East India Company in 1750. The lack of a fossil record of elephants on Borneo has been cited as support for the theory that elephants have been recently introduced to Borneo. Fernando, et al., found that the elephants on Borneo have been genetically isolated from other Asian elephant populations for approximately 300,000 years, and, assuming that any elephants introduced into Borneo by the East India Company were from India, Sumatra, or peninsular Malaya, concluded that the elephants in Borneo are indigenous, representing a colonization during the Pleistocene. The Earl of Cranbrook, et al. conclude that either an indigenous occupation of Borneo since the Pleistocene, or a recent introduction from Java, are plausible for the origin for the Borneo elephants. If the Borneo elephants are descended from Javan elephants, then the Javan elephants presumably would have also been genetically distinct from other Asian elephant populations.

See also
Asian elephant
Borneo elephant
Indian elephant
Sri Lankan elephant
Sumatran elephant
Syrian elephant
Elephas hysudrindicus

References

Elephants
Fauna of Java